Bardney railway station was a station in Bardney, Lincolnshire. North of the station the line split in two with one branch going to Lincoln and the other to Louth.

Bardney station was removed brick by brick and placed in the care of Railworld in Peterborough.

Route

References

Disused railway stations in Lincolnshire
Former Great Northern Railway stations
Railway stations in Great Britain opened in 1848
Railway stations in Great Britain closed in 1970
Beeching closures in England